The Roman Catholic Diocese of Parnaíba is a diocese located in the city of Parnaíba in the Ecclesiastical province of Teresina in Brazil.

History
 16 December 1944: Established as Diocese of Parnaíba from the Diocese of Piaui

Bishops of Parnaíba 
 Felipe Benito Condurú Pacheco (1946.02.07 – 1959.01.17)
 Paulo Hipólito de Souza Libório (1959.06.20 – 1980.04.23)
 Edvaldo Gonçalves Amaral, S.D.B. (later Archbishop) (1980.09.02 – 1985.10.24)
 Joaquim Rufino do Rêgo (1986.03.25 – 2001.02.21)
 Alfredo Schäffler (2001.02.21 – 2016.08.24)
 Juarez Sousa da Silva (4 August 2016 – 4 January 2023)

Coadjutor bishops
Alfredo Schäffler (2000-2001)
Juarez Sousa Da Silva (2016)

References

External links 
 GCatholic.org
 Catholic Hierarchy

Roman Catholic dioceses in Brazil
Christian organizations established in 1944
Parnaiba, Roman Catholic Diocese of
Roman Catholic dioceses and prelatures established in the 20th century